Melaleuca leuropoma is a plant in the myrtle family, Myrtaceae and is endemic to the south-west of Western Australia. It is a small to medium-sized shrub which flowers over an extended period with flower colour varying from purple to yellow or white. The glossy, often brown petals covering the flower buds are also an unusual characteristic of this species.

Description
They are also glossy and often have short, silky hairs.

The flowers colour is variable, from pink or purple to yellow or white and shades in between. The flowers are arranged in heads or short spikes on the ends of branches which continue to grow after flowering and sometimes also in the upper leaf axils. The outer surface of the floral cup (the hypanthium) is hairy and there are five bundles of stamens around the flower, each with 7 to 11 stamens.

Taxonomy and naming
The specific epithet (leuropoma) is derived from ancient Greek words meaning "smooth" or "polished", and "a lid" or "a cover", referring to the unusual, glossy petals covering the flower buds.

Distribution and habitat
Melaleuca leuropoma occurs in and between the Kalbarri, Gairdner Range and Moora districts in the Avon Wheatbelt, Geraldton Sandplains and Swan Coastal Plain biogeographic regions. It grows in a range of vegetation associations in sand over sandstone and limestone.

Conservation status
Melaleuca leuropoma is listed as "not threatened" by the Government of Western Australia Department of Parks and Wildlife.

References

leuropoma
Plants described in 1999
Endemic flora of Western Australia
Taxa named by Lyndley Craven